John Eklund may refer to:

 John Eklund (Ohio politician) (fl. 1980s—2020s), Ohio state senator
 John Eklund Jr. (fl. 2000s—2020s), Wyoming state representative
 John Eklund (skier) (born 1993), Swedish freestyle skier